The Tuloma (and ) is a river in Murmansk Oblast in Russia.

The river has its sources in the Saariselkä mountains in the eastern parts of the Lapland region in Finland. The Tuloma itself is formed by the confluence of the rivers Lotta and Nota rivers in the Verkhnetulomskoye Reservoir (formerly Lake Notozero).

Hydro Power development
There are two hydroelectric power stations on the Tuloma. The Lower Tuloma was finished in 1938, and is located at the town of Murmashi, close to the rivers outflow into the Kola Bay.

The second and largest power plant, the Upper Tuloma, was built in the 1960s at Verkhnetulomsky, 60 kilometres further upriver.

Fishing

The Tuloma used to be a great salmon river, on a par with the famous Tana River in Norway in productivity, with annual catches in excess of 100 tons.  At Padun Falls at the outflow from Lake Notozero the Skolt Sami had rights to catch salmon in a large weir, and every year tens of tons of salmon was caught at this site alone. 

When  hydro power plants were built the salmon spawning grounds and migration routes were destroyed. At the first power plant, the Lower Tuloma, a fish ladder was built. Within a few years salmon catches soon approached their former levels. When the Upper Tuloma plant and a dam at Verkhnetulomskiy were built the salmon stock collapsed. Lake Notozero became part of the large Verkhnetulomskoye reservoir, and the Padun Falls was gone. A fish lift was built at the dam, but it did not work and was closed down after a short time. There remains, however, a small salmon stock in the Toluma, spawning in the tributaries below the dam, especially in the Pecha. (tuulomajoki.fi)

There is a project under way to ascertain whether it is possible to reestablish the salmon to the river, by allowing the fish to pass the dams and thus reaching spawning grounds in the tributaries above the reservoirs, which are still in their natural state.  It is hoped that this will bring substantial benefits to the region, through recreational fishing and eco-tourism. (Tuloma River Project)

References

External links
 

Rivers of Murmansk Oblast